S. Ramappa is a politician from the state of Karnataka. He is a leader of Indian National Congress Party. He is current MLA of Harihar assembly constituency in the Karnataka Legislative Assembly.

Career 
He contested from Harihar in 2013 assembly elections but he lost to H S Shiva Shankar of JD(S). And in 2018, he won as MLA by defeating B.P.Harish of BJP.

References 

Living people
Year of birth missing (living people)
People from Karnataka
Indian National Congress politicians
People from Davanagere
Indian National Congress politicians from Karnataka